John Milton Gaver Sr.  (October 29, 1900 – July 11, 1982) was an American Hall of Fame Thoroughbred racehorse trainer.

Born in Mount Airy, Maryland, John Gaver graduated from Princeton University then worked as a prep school language teacher before eventually embarking on a career in Thoroughbred racing. In 1929, James G. Rowe Jr., a friend and horse trainer, invited him to join the team managing the Brookdale Farm and racing stable owned by Harry Payne Whitney.

After Harry Payne Whitney died in 1930, James Rowe Jr. took over the running of the Mrs. Payne Whitney family's Greentree Stable and asked John Gaver to come with him. In 1939, Gaver was appointed head trainer for Greentree Stable, a position he would hold for the next thirty-eight years. During his time with Greentree, John Gaver conditioned seventy-three stakes-winning horses, including winners of five American Classic Races. Four of his horses earned Champions honors with Capot and Tom Fool voted Horse of the Year in 1946 and 1953 respectively.

In 1966 John Gaver was inducted into the National Museum of Racing and Hall of Fame. In 1977 he suffered a stroke and his son John Jr. took over as trainer for the  Greentree Stable. He retired to Aiken, South Carolina where he had maintained a winter training center for many years. He died there at Aiken Community Hospital in 1982 and was buried in the Lexington Cemetery, Lexington, Kentucky.

Selected other major race wins:
 Lexington Stakes (1936)
 Diana Handicap (1940)
 Breeders' Futurity (1941, 1950, 1952)
 Gazelle Handicap (1941, 1967)
 Top Flight Handicap (1941)
 Phoenix Handicap (1942)
 Widener Handicap (1942)
 Toboggan Handicap (1943, 1944)
 Arlington-Washington Lassie Stakes (1944)
 Manhattan Handicap (1944)
 Paumonok Handicap (1944, 1945)
 Vosburgh Stakes (1946)
 Peter Pan Stakes (1947)
 Jerome Handicap (1949, 1952)
 American Derby (1951)
 Belmont Futurity Stakes (1951)
 Fall Highweight Handicap (1951)
 Monmouth Oaks (1951)
 Empire City Handicap (1952)
 Philip H. Iselin Handicap (1952)
 Wilson Stakes (1952, 1953)
 Miss Woodford Stakes (1953)
 Jim Dandy Stakes (1964)
 Saranac Handicap (1968)
 Aqueduct Handicap (1965)
 Ladies Handicap (1967)
 Tremont Stakes (1968)
 Saratoga Special Stakes (1972)

References
 John M. Gaver at the National Museum of Racing and Hall of Fame

1900 births
1982 deaths
People from Mount Airy, Maryland
Princeton University alumni
20th-century American educators
American racehorse trainers
United States Thoroughbred Racing Hall of Fame inductees
Sportspeople from Aiken, South Carolina